Assiminea palauensis is a species of minute, salt marsh snail with an operculum, an aquatic gastropod mollusk, or micromollusks, in the family Assimineidae. This species is endemic to Palau.

References

Assimineidae
Fauna of Palau
Endemic fauna of Palau
Gastropods described in 1927
Taxonomy articles created by Polbot